Super Nova Racing was a British racing team that has competed in Formula 3000/GP2 and the A1 Grand Prix series. Super Nova first entered racing in 1991. Super Nova was a new incarnation of the pre-existing David Sears Motorsport, sponsored by the Nova chain of Japanese English schools and also ran the Danish Den Blå Avis outfit.

In July 2007, naming sponsor Nova's legal problems became the subject of intense media coverage in Japan, and by the end of September 2007 the company was reported to be unable to pay staff salaries or rent, being declared bankrupt in November 2007 amidst a widening scandal about business improprieties, but SuperNova continued to list Nova as a sponsor. On 24 June 2008, President Saruhashi of the Nova chain of English schools was taken into police custody and faced charges of embezzlement. In August 2009, Saruhashi was convicted and sentenced to a 42-month jail term.

In February 2012, it was announced that Super Nova would withdraw from the GP2 Series. They were replaced by the Italian team Lazarus.

On 1 July 2014 Super Nova announced that it will be competing in the FIA Formula E Championship under the Trulli GP name.

Complete series results

AutoGP

Complete former series results

GP2 Series 

Notes:
1. - Andy Soucek scored 1 of his 14 points in 2 races for David Price Racing.
2. - Luca Filippi also scored 45 points for Scuderia Coloni in 8 races.

In Detail 
(key) (Races in bold indicate pole position) (Races in italics indicate fastest lap)

GP2 Asia Series

Formula 3000

A1 Grand Prix 
They have competed for all seasons in A1 Grand Prix since series debuts in 2005-06, fielding entries for both A1 Team Germany and A1 Team Pakistan and later for A1 Team New Zealand. In 2006-07, the both managed team, Germany and New Zealand finishing 1st and 2nd in the Championship overall.

Timeline

Footnotes

References

External links 
 supernova-racing.com, official website.

British auto racing teams
International Formula 3000 teams
A1 Grand Prix racing teams
GP2 Series teams
GP3 Series teams
Formula Renault Eurocup teams
Japanese Formula 3 Championship teams
1991 establishments in the United Kingdom
Auto racing teams established in 1991
Auto racing teams disestablished in 2015
Auto GP teams
British Formula Three teams